is a Japanese actor, producer, entrepreneur, martial artist, and philanthropist. He is best known for his starring roles in The Last Samurai and the Disney's movie Wendy Wu: Homecoming Warrior on Disney+. He has produced numerous contents in films, shows, video games, comic books and anime through Shinca Entertainment. Koyamada is a President of ChimeTV International, a national Asian American TV cable network and digital platform in the United States. He is also a Member Board of Directors, International President and anime producer of N Lite Media Corp., an American anime production company.

Koyamada is also known for his philanthropic efforts in youth leadership, humanitarian aid, gender equality, citizen diplomacy, climate action, habitat conservation through Koyamada International Foundation (KIF). He holds black belts in Japanese and Korean martial arts, and has also won U.S. national championships in Chinese martial arts.

Early life

Koyamada was born in Okayama, Japan. His family is descended from Kagenori Koyamada of the Koyamada clan, a Samurai clan originally from what is now Kagoshima Prefecture. In high school, Koyamada was team captain in gymnastics and competed in the Okayama Prefecture tournament for three years. He also enrolled in a Karate school, his first martial arts experience. He graduated from Ichinomiya high school in Okayama in March 2000.

Move to the United States 

On June 11, 2000, Koyamada moved to the United States to further his studies. He enrolled in the ESL program at the University of California, Riverside. Later that year, he studied at Los Angeles City College, and began taking acting lessons.

Hollywood career

2000-2001: Early work 

Starting in 2000, Koyamada auditioned for many commercials and acted in student films and music videos. He also booked national commercials for Disneyland, Apple Computer and JC Penney. In 2001, Koyamada choreographed and performed martial arts forms and stage combat in a production of Shakespeare's Coriolanus for the Knightsbridge Theater in Pasadena. Koyamada also made a brief guest appearance in Power Rangers Wild Force and co-starred in the award-winning American short comedy film A Ninja Pays Half My Rent.

2002-2004: The Last Samurai and breakthrough 

Koyamada's debut film role was in the hit film The Last Samurai (2003), co-starring as Nobutada, a son of Ken Watanabe's character Katsumoto and a young Samurai who befriends Algren, played by Tom Cruise. His character became known for the iconic lines "Jolly Good" and "No Mind". The film grossed $456 million at the box office and was nominated for several Academy Awards,  Golden Globes, and National Board of Review Awards.

2005-2009: Wendy Wu: Homecoming Warrior and producing 

In 2006, Koyamada starred alongside Brenda Song in the Disney Channel's Wendy Wu: Homecoming Warrior, which become one of the highest rated original movies on the channel. The film also broke records in the United Kingdom and Europe. From 2006 to 2008, Koyamada was a regular in the Disney Channel Games.

In late 2005, Koyamada and his wife Nia Lyte formed production company Shinca Entertainment to develop and produce a television and live streaming talk show The Nia Lyte Show (2006). In Japan, Koyamada starred in and executive produced the Japanese documentary film Wine Road of the Samurai.

In 2007, Koyamada starred in and produced the short film Good Soil. Koyamada next appeared in the 20th Century Fox drama Constellation (2007).

In 2009, Koyamada partnered with Travis Moore and Nia Lyte to form comics company Laizen Comics. Koyamada, Moore and Lyte created The Dreamhoppers (2010), which was published and distributed by Laizen Comics to independent comic book stores throughout the United States .

2010-present: Exploring Asia and production expansion 

Koyamada continued to explore working in Japan and starred in the Japanese stage production Ai No Shizuku. He also starred in and produced the film  Heart of the Dragon (2013). Koyamada also produced a multi-part television and web series comprising Spirit Fashion Show (2013), Spirit Art Show (2013), Spirit Music Show (2013), Spirit Love Show (2013) and Spirit Earth Show (2014), with Claudia Hallowell and Nia Lyte and distributed by Spirit Show Network.

Upcoming projects 
Koyamada has starred in and produced an American feature film The Yokai King. The film is expected to be released internationally in 2021.

Through Shinca Entertainment, Koyamada has developed and produced other comic book series and digital stickers for a mobile chatting system. He has also been developing numerous action films, Japanese-style animation and mobile games.

Philanthropic work 

Koyamada is known for various global philanthropic efforts. Koyamada and his wife founded an international non-governmental organization Koyamada International Foundation (KIF) to improve quality of people's lives by empowering global youth and women, and providing humanitarian aid to promote world peace and sustainable development.

Ambassadorships 

Koyamada has been appointed as an U.S. Department of State Cultural Envoy and a Japan-America Society Southern California Special Ambassador. Koyamada has been appointed to several goodwill ambassadorships in Japan, including  Okayama Prefecture Tourism Ambassador in 2010, Kyoto Tourism Ambassador in 2012 and 2020 Tokyo Olympics Karate Ambassador.

Youth leadership and international education 

Koyamada has been invited by the U.S. Embassy Tokyo in 2011 to lecture to Japanese students in five different cities to promote international education. 

Since 2015, Koyamada has given lectures at both private and national universities in Japan, including Kansai University, Ritsumeikan University, Kindai University, Seinan Gakuin University, Okayama University, Okinawa International University and Miyazaki Municipal University.

In late 2019, Koyamada spoke at Mount Kenya University in Nairobi, Kenya. In February 2020, Embassy of the United States, Moscow and its consulates invited Koyamada to be a keynote speaker.

Humanitarian aid 

Since 2008, Koyamada has assisted homeless people in Los Angeles through KIF's program in providing foods and drinks. In response to the triple disaster (such as earthquake, tsunami, and nuclear disaster) in Japan, Koyamada led fundraising efforts in California and donated to 3 affected prefectures in Tohoku region of Japan. Koyamada also shipped 20-foot containers filled with basic necessities directly to victims. Recently, in 2018, he has also assisted a number of natural disasters, such as devastating floods and Hokkaido Eastern Iburi earthquake in Japan.

Subnational diplomacy 

In July 2017, Koyamada became the first Japanese National Board of Directors of Sister Cities International (SCI). He led global initiatives on engaging global youth. In 2019, he created the Japan-Texas Leaderships Symposium, a bilateral business and cultural event.

Martial arts community 

Koyamada is also well known in the international martial arts community for supporting martial arts organizations and activities. His first martial arts experience was when he took physical education class in Judo in middle school.

1998-2000: Early development 

By 16, Koyamada began to study Keishinkan Karate. In 1998, he competed in a national Karate Championship in Nagano. In 1999, he fought again at the same championship, and was awarded his first Degree Black Belt skipped directly from a White Belt.

2000-2004: Training in Kung Fu and national champion 

After relocating to Los Angeles in 2000, he gave private karate lessons for a few months. He began training in Northern Shaolin Kung Fu with the Harmonious Fist Chinese Athletic Association.  Koyamada specialized in the empty hand form Bot Bo (拔步) and double broadsword. In 2001 and 2002, Koyamada competed in six U.S national martial arts competitions in several major cities, including San Diego, Las Vegas, San Francisco. In 2004, Koyamada was featured on the cover of  Black Belt Magazine.

2005-2015: Further studies and martial arts festival 
In 2005, Koyamada earned san-dan (third degree) Black Belt in traditional Keishinkan Karate. He also begun studying Iaijutsu, a Japanese combative quick-draw sword technique, an art of drawing the Japanese sword, katana, and one of the Japanese koryū martial art disciplines in the education of the Samurai.

Koyamada also started training in Korean martial arts Tae Kwon Do. After a year of training, he earned a first degree black belt, and eventually a second degree black belt. In 2007, Koyamada began studying in Korea's Royal Court Martial Arts, for which he was certified as a 1st Degree Black Belt in 2009. In 2009, he performed traditional Japanese swordsmanship at the Martial Arts Tour held in Nettuno, Italy.

In 2010 and 2011, he founded the United States Martial Arts Festival (USMAF), held in Redondo Beach, California. At USMAF, world renowned martial arts masters and youth performed different styles such as Karate, Shaolin Kung Fu, Krav Maga, Capoera, MMA, Tae Kwon Do, Shorinji Kempo, American Kenpo, Boxing, Marine Corps Martial Arts Program and others.

2016-present: Karate for 2020 Tokyo Olympics 

In 2016, Koyamada was appointed as Tokyo 2020 Summer Olympics Karate Ambassador as part of an ongoing efforts to include Karate into the additional Olympics Games and to promote Karate internationally. In August 2016, the International Olympic Committee approved Karate as an Olympic sport for the first time in its history, beginning at the 2020 Summer Olympics. In 2017, he attended as a special guest for the first Emperor's Cup and Empress's Cup All Japan Karate Championship at Nippon Budokan in Tokyo.

Entrepreneurship

Production company 

In 2005, Koyamada formed a production company Shinca Entertainment, based in Burbank, California. The company has since produced content, including the comic book series The Dreamhoppers under various brands.

International consulting 

In 2012, Koyamada established Shinca Enterprise, a consulting firm to bridge American startup companies in Japan and South America. In 2017, the company's clients include a wide range of businesses such as agriculture, technology, retail, energy, mining, sports, foods and entertainment industries.

Personal life 

Koyamada is married to Carolina Manrique (known professionally as Nia Lyte), a Colombian-American producer.

Filmography

References

External links
ShinKoyamada.com official website

KIF official website
Shinca Group official website

1982 births
Japanese male television actors
21st-century Japanese male actors
Living people
People from Okayama
Japanese male karateka
Japanese kendoka
Japanese wushu practitioners
American wushu practitioners
Japanese male taekwondo practitioners
Japanese emigrants to the United States